Prevail (IX-537) is a modified  auxiliary general ocean surveillance ship (AGOS) of the United States Navy previously operated by the U.S. Military Sealift Command as T-AGOS 8.  Prevail was reclassified as Unclassified Miscellaneous (IX) in October 2003 and is unofficially referred to as TSV-1.  In this context, TSV stands for Training Support Vessel, and should not be confused with the U.S. Army's  Theater Support Vessel initiative.

Prevail is currently assigned to Commander, Carrier Strike Group Four and is operated with a minimal, hybrid crew of civil service and contract mariners.  The ship provides a dedicated training support for Strike Group training for U.S. Atlantic Fleet ships, including serving as a platform for training Visit, Board, Search, and Seizure (VBSS) operations.

Stalwart-class ships were originally designed to collect underwater acoustical data in support of Cold War anti-submarine warfare operations in the 1980s.

Design
The Stalwart-class ocean surveillance ships were succeeded by the longer Victorious class. It was powered by a diesel-electric system of four Caterpillar D-398 diesel-powered generators and two General Electric  electric motors. This produced a total of  that drove two shafts. It had a gross register tonnage of 1,584 and a deadweight tonnage of 786.

They were built to be fitted with the Surveillance Towed Array Sensor System (SURTASS) system. The ship had an endurance of thirty days. Its complement was between thirty-two and forty-seven. Its hull design was similar to that of the s.

References

Solicitation notice - USNS PREVAIL (TSV-1), PMF, SSP-501-06
Ex-USNS Prevail takes on new role for Navy. December 2003.

External links

Stalwart-class ocean surveillance ships
Cold War auxiliary ships of the United States
Ships built by Tacoma Boatbuilding Company
1985 ships